The Mid-American Conference first sponsored football in 1947. This is a list of its annual standings since establishment.

Standings

References

Mid-American Conference
Standings